

Robert Andrew Kreinar (November 26, 1937 – July 16, 2012), known as Bob Babbitt, was a Hungarian-American bassist, most famous for his work as a member of Motown Records' studio band, the Funk Brothers, from 1966 to 1972, as well as his tenure as part of MFSB for Philadelphia International Records afterwards. Also in 1968, with Mike Campbell, Ray Monette and Andrew Smith he formed the band Scorpion, which lasted until 1970. He is ranked number 59 on Bass Player magazine's list of "The 100 Greatest Bass Players of All Time".

Babbitt traded off sessions with original Motown bassist James Jamerson. When Motown moved to Los Angeles, Babbit went in the opposite direction and ended up in New York as well as making occasional trips to Philadelphia.  In this new city he worked on recordings for Frank Sinatra, Barry Manilow, Gloria Gaynor, Robert Palmer, and Alice Cooper.  During this time his most notable successes were "Midnight Train to Georgia" by Gladys Knight & the Pips and  "The Rubberband Man" by The Spinners.

The Pittsburgh-born Babbitt's most notable bass performances include "Signed, Sealed, Delivered I'm Yours" by Stevie Wonder; "War" by Edwin Starr; "The Tears of a Clown" by Smokey Robinson & the Miracles; "Mercy Mercy Me (The Ecology)" and "Inner City Blues" by Marvin Gaye; "Band Of Gold" by Freda Payne; "Ball of Confusion (That's What the World Is Today)" and "Just My Imagination (Running Away with Me)" by The Temptations; "Touch Me in the Morning" by Diana Ross; and “Just Don’t Want to Be Lonely” by The Main Ingredient.

He participated in hundreds of other hits, including "Little Town Flirt" by Del Shannon and "Scorpio" by Dennis Coffey & the Detroit Guitar Band. He played on the Jimi Hendrix album Crash Landing. He also played bass on Cindy Bullens' 1979 album Desire Wire. He accepted an offer from Phil Collins to perform on his album of Motown and 1960s soul classics, Going Back, and also appeared in Collins' Going Back - Live At Roseland Ballroom, NYC concert DVD. He appeared on stage in an episode of American Idol, backing up Jacob Lusk's performance of "You're All I Need To Get By" for AI's Motown Week in March 2011.

In 2003, Babbitt played on Marion James' album, Essence, on Soulfood Records, and amongst others playing on the record were Beegie Adair, Reese Wynans, Jack Pearson (The Allman Brothers), and drummer Chucki Burke.

He was added to the Music City Walk of Fame on June 5, 2012.

Bob Babbitt died on July 16, 2012, aged 74, from brain cancer.

Discography

with Tom Rush
Ladies Love Outlaws (CBS, 1974)
with Herbie Mann
Surprises (Atlantic, 1976)
with Alice Cooper 
Go To Hell ( song only ) 1976 
With Jimmy McGriff
Red Beans (Groove Merchant, 1976)
With Lonnie Smith
Keep on Lovin' (Groove Merchant, 1976)
With Stanley Turrentine
The Man with the Sad Face (Fantasy, 1976)
With Rodriguez
Cold Fact (Sussex, 1970)

References

Sources

External links
Official website
Bob Babbit Profile -Pittsburgh Music History
Interview with Bob Babbitt Part 1, Part 2, Part 3, by Bass Frontiers Magazine, 2010
 

1937 births
2012 deaths
American rhythm and blues bass guitarists
American male bass guitarists
American session musicians
American funk bass guitarists
Musicians from Pittsburgh
The Funk Brothers members
Deaths from brain cancer in the United States
American people of Hungarian descent
Guitarists from Pennsylvania
20th-century American bass guitarists
20th-century American male musicians
Motown artists
MFSB members
The Group with No Name members